Super Indian is an Indian superhero, one of a number of titles published by Raj Comics.

Origin
Super Indian is actually Aman, born to the fictional terrorist chief Ahankari, as a clone. Ahankari considered cloning himself after suffering a near fatal encounter with William Boother, an infiltrator. He selected Dr. Heathrow to create a clone of himself in every aspect. The clone grew to adulthood very rapidly due to accelerated cloned genes. A host of super villains was selected to impart training and equipment to the clone in order to make him a perfect successor to the terrorist leader. At this point, Ahankari's father, fearing that the clone would also turn out evil like his son, arranged for the Indian mystic "Rudraksh Baba" to take charge of his grandson. After some initial resistance by the clone, Rudraksh Baba mystically purged all evil from the clone and concentrated it under the mark of a Trident, carried by Lord Shiva. This process gave rise to another side effect - whenever the clone sensed evil, his skin would turn blue. Rudraksh baba instructed the clone, now known as Aman (Peace) to live the life of a hero, donning the ceremonial Indian "dhoti" as a mark of his embraced mysticism. Aman took up the name Super Indian and went on to learn heroics from various Indian Superheroes from the Raj Comics universe. He defends India & the high tech Metro City, his base of operations. he now protects the Metro City. He calls all the members of P.O.E.M (Protectors Of Earth & Mankind) his uncles and aunt as he has no real relative in this world, and looks up to them as his guardians.

VITAL STATS:

Height- 6'3"
Weight- 90 kg (200 lbs)
Superpowers- Superstrength, Enhanced Endurance, Superspeed, Flight.

Enemies
As soon as he started crime-fighting, Super Indian has made his own share of rogues gallery who threaten his life and the City he protects. His nemesis includes :

· Uncle Metro : He is the Crime Lord of Metro City, who claims that no crime happens in Metro City without his knowledge or permission. His nephew Petro was severely injured during the battle with Super Indian, and ultimately got into coma. He vowed revenge on Super Indian for sending his nephew to coma and wants to kill him out of vengeance.

· Nephew Petro : The nephew of the Crime Lord, Uncle Metro. He was severely injured during his first fight with Super Indian and is currently in coma.

· Red Eyebrow : A scientific genius, Red Eyebrow wanted himself to be the developer of the Metro City, but lost to some other scientist. Now he seeks vengeance on the city and wants to destroy it completely and recreate it all by himself.

Super Indian's Comic Issues
Raj Comics has published the following titles as Super Indian's issues:

Titles
Raj Comics has published a huge number of Titles on Super Indian. A list can be viewed at
 Titles by Raj Comics

External links
Raj Comics
NilnNilu Antipiracy Comic Group

Raj Comics superheroes
Fictional Indian people
Indian superheroes
Indian mythology in popular culture
Hindu mythology in popular culture